Benjamen Chinn (April 30, 1921 – April 25, 2009) was an American photographer known especially for his black and white images of Chinatown, San Francisco and of Paris, France in the late 1940s and early 1950s.

Biography
Born in San Francisco's Chinatown on April 30, 1921, Benjamen Chinn was the ninth of twelve children.  He was introduced to photography at the age of ten by his older brother, John, who taught him how to develop and print photos.  Together the two assembled a darkroom in the basement of the family home.  Throughout his photographic career, Chinn, an engineer by profession, would become known for his skills in the darkroom.

During World War II, he served in the Pacific as an aerial and public relations photographer for the U.S. Army Air Corps.  Based at Hickam Field in Hawaii, he and a lone pilot flew reconnaissance missions in bombers that had been converted into unarmed camera planes.

After the war, Chinn returned to San Francisco and was accepted into a new fine art photography program at the California School of Fine Arts (CSFA), now the San Francisco Art Institute.  In this program, Ansel Adams and Minor White groomed the next generation of fine art photographers in the so-called “West Coast School of Photography.”  Lecturers included Edward Weston, Imogen Cunningham, Lisette Model and Dorothea Lange.    "The climax of every year was the five day, early spring trip to visit Edward Weston and to photograph at Point Lobos State Reserve, which his pictures had made famous.  Full time concern with photography was nothing new to us, but on this trip the intensity rose like a thermometer held over a match flame."   The close-knit circle of teachers and students would become lifelong friends.  Chinn was particularly close to Cunningham, and through the end of her life he would often bring dim sum to her house for their lunches together.

During this time Chinn began photographing San Francisco's Chinatown.  His images exhibit a non-judgmental eye and a natural curiosity about people.  He made intimate portraits of everyday life in the post-war era.  His photos display an intuitive sense of form and movement and he credited his development to his CSFA painting instructors Dorr Bothwell and Richard Diebenkorn.  The photos, many of which were taken from his doorstep, create a unique portrait of Chinatown from an insider's point of view.

Chinn went on to Europe and photographed Parisian street life from 1950 to 1951 while studying sculpture from Alberto Giacometti at the Académie Julian.  He also took painting classes at Fernand Léger’s school, and geography and philosophy at the Sorbonne.  He became friends with Léger and Henri Cartier-Bresson.  Living in Paris,  without a darkroom for the first time, he developed the negatives of the photos he took, but did not print or see any of the images until after he returned to San Francisco.

In 1954, Minor White exhibited some of Chinn’s Paris photos at a show titled Perceptions at the San Francisco Museum of Art (now the San Francisco Museum of Modern Art).  White used one of them for the cover of the second edition of Aperture magazine. At this time, Chinn assisted Wayne Miller and Dorothea Lange as part of the West Coast Selection Committee for Edward Steichen's Family of Man exhibition.

In 1953, Chinn went to work for the Sixth United States Army Photo Lab in the Presidio of San Francisco.  He met Paul Caponigro, then a twenty-year-old enlisted man doing his military service at the lab.  Initially attracted by their mutual interest in classical music, Ben volunteered to train Caponigro in the technical aspects of negative and print making.  Caponigro would go on to become a substantial landscape art photographer.  Additionally, he introduced Caponigro to his teachers, now friends, from the CSFA: Adams, White, Lange and Cunningham.  Caponigro writes, “Through Ben, I felt that I had been admitted into a 'guild' of serious image makers using light and silver emulsions.  Ben's own talent and ability with the camera coupled with his willingness to reach out to another human being gave me a great start and the inspiration to extend myself to those searching to develop within the realm of great art.”

Chinn had a thirty-one year career at the army photo lab where he rose to Chief of Photographic Services and later, Chief of Training Aids & Services Division.  Though he stopped pursuing photography as a fine art, his life and relationships as a photographer never ceased.  He continued to travel with his camera, photographing the Tarahumara Indians in Copper Canyon, Mexico, and the indigenous peoples of Teotitlán.

Throughout his life, Chinn developed and maintained numerous lifelong friendships.  He actively participated in social groups that shared his beliefs in religion, the arts, travel and the enjoyment of food and good company – spending hours discussing classical music, films and the books of the day.  He continued to photograph with a 35mm camera and shared his artistry through holiday cards and documentary photography support for Project Concern International.

Even after retiring, Chinn's passion for photography continued, as he volunteered at a one-hour photo store in Chinatown developing people's photos.

Benjamen Chinn lived in the family house in Chinatown until February, 2008, when he was moved to an assisted-living facility.  He died on April 25, 2009 at Kaiser Permanente Hospital in San Francisco, California.

Legacy
Benjamen Chinn's work evidenced  the influence of the world of black and white art photography in the United States, during the 1940s and 1950s.  His work also became influential for many new and already esteemed artists.  While his work has had a number of exhibitions (see below), it has largely lain unrecognized until the turn of the 21st century.  In more than one of his publications, noted landscape photographer Paul Caponigro has acknowledged the influence that studying with Benjamen Chinn had on him.

Author Alexandra Chang wrote, "His work, varying from still life, to the architecture of San Francisco Chinatown, to portraits, exudes an Atget-like quality of a moment from everyday life frozen in time."

Since his death, a process has been developed to archive Chinn's entire photographic work and digitize it for analysis by artists and scholars.

Solo exhibitions
De Anza College Gallery, Cupertino, California, 1965
Benjamen Chinn at Home in San Francisco. Chinese Historical Society of America, San Francisco, 2003
Benjamen Chinn: Photographs of Paris: 1949–1950, Scott Nichols Gallery, San Francisco, 2005/6
Benjamen Chinn: Paris 1950 -1951, SFO Museum, Terminal 3/Gate 76, September 2011 - November 2011
Benjamen Chinn's Paris: 1950 - 1951, Smith Andersen North Gallery, San Anselmo CA, October 2011

Group exhibitions
Mendocino, San Francisco Museum of Art, 1948
Perceptions, San Francisco Museum of Art, 1954
Mt. Angel College, Mt. Angel, Oregon, 1964
San Francisco Arts Festival, San Francisco, 1960s (four consecutive years)
California School of Fine Arts 125th Anniversary Exhibit, Focus Gallery, San Francisco, 1972
Alumni Exhibition, San Francisco Art Institute, Anniversary Exhibition, Focus Gallery, San Francisco, 1981
San Francisco Art Institute: 50 Years of Photography, Transamerica Pyramid Gallery, San Francisco, 1998
Leading the Way: Asian American Artists of the Older Generation, Gordon College, Wenham, MA, 2001
The First Decade 1946–1956, Alumni Work from The San Francisco Art Institute, Smith Anderson North Gallery, 2006
Perceptions: Bay Area Photography, 1945–1960, Los Angeles Valley College, Valley Glen, CA, 2006
Celebrating 60 Years of Photography at the San Francisco Art Institute, San Francisco Art Institute,  September 2006
Asian|American|Modern Art: Shifting Currents, 1900–1970, de Young Museum, San Francisco, 2008
The Golden Decade: California School of Fine Arts Photography, 1945 - 1955. Smith Andersen North Gallery, San Anselmo, 2010
 The Golden Decade: Photography at the California School of Fine Arts, 1945 - 1955.   Mumm Napa Winery, Rutherford CA, 2014

Collections
Center for Creative Photography, University of Arizona, Tucson
Chinese Historical Society of America, San Francisco
The Hallmark Photographic Collection, Nelson-Atkins Museum of Art, Kansas City, MO
San Francisco Museum of Modern Art
Cantor Arts Center, Stanford University

Bibliography
Aperture No. 2, 1952, Cover photo
An American Century of Photography: From Dry Point to Digital, Vol.2, Keith Davis, Hallmark Photographic Collection, 1995
Benjamen Chinn, CAAABS project interview, August 14, 1998. Transcript, Asian American Art Project, Stanford University
Chinatown Losing Landmark, Anastasia Hendrix, San Francisco Chronicle, July 7, 2000
Leading the Way: Asian American Artists of the Older Generation, Irene Poon, Gordon College, 2001
Benjamen Chinn at Home in San Francisco, Chinese Historical Society of America, Exhibition Catalog, Irene Poon, Dennis Reed, and Paul Caponigro, 2003
Focus: Chinatown. Photographer studied with greats, traveled the world, but kept his sights on his neighborhood, Lord Martine, San Francisco Chronicle, January 31, 2003
Ten Photographers, 1946 – 54, The Legacy of Minor White: California School of Fine Arts, The Exhibition Perceptions, Deborah Klochko, 2004
The Moment of Seeing, Minor White at the California School of Fine Arts, Stephanie Comer and Deborah Klochko, 2006
San Francisco's Chinatown, Judy Yung and the Chinese Historical Society of America, Arcadia Publishing, 2006
Asian American Art: A History, 1850–1970, Gordon Chang, Mark Dean Johnson and Paul Karlstrom, 2008
Asian|American|Modern Art: Shifting Currents, 1900–1970, Daniell Cornell and Mark Dean Johnson, editors, 2008

References

External links
  Website devoted to Chinn's photography with rotating galleries of images.
  Imogen Cunningham, photographer, teacher and friend of Benjamen Chinn
  William Heick, photographer, friend, classmate of at the California School of Fine Arts
  Philip Hyde, landscape photographer, friend, classmate of Ben Chinn at the California School of Fine Arts
  Scott Nichols Gallery which represented Chinn
  Los Angeles Times obituary of Benjamen Chinn, May 25, 2009

1921 births
2009 deaths
Académie Julian alumni
Photographers from California
Photographers from San Francisco